Ann Pudeator (November 13, 1621 – , 1692) was a wealthy septuagenarian widow who was accused of and convicted of witchcraft in the Salem witch trials in colonial Massachusetts. She was executed by hanging.

Personal life
Ann's maiden name is not known, nor the place of her birth. Thomas Greenslade was her first husband and they had five children (Thomas Jr., Ruth, John, Samuel, and James).

After Thomas' death in 1674, she was hired by Jacob Pudeator to nurse his alcoholic wife, who died in 1675. Ann then married Jacob in 1676. Jacob died in 1682, leaving Ann well-off.

Some have theorized that Ann Pudeator's likely occupation as a nurse and midwife, along with her being a woman of property, made her vulnerable to charges of witchcraft.

Witch trials

When she was accused of witchcraft, the inventory of Goody Pudeator's alleged misdeeds included:

 Presenting the Devil's Book to a girl and forcing her to sign it
 Bewitchment causing the death of a neighbor's wife
 Appearing in spectral form to afflicted girls
 Having witchcraft materials in her home, which she claimed was grease for making soap
 Torturing with pins
 Causing a man to fall out of a tree
 Killing her own second husband and his first wife
 Turning herself into a bird and flying into her house

Many of these allegations were made by Mary Warren, one of the so-called "afflicted girls". Her other accusers were Ann Putnam Jr., John Best Sr., John Best Jr., and Samuel Pickworth. It is not known where she is buried, but a memorial stone for her exists at the Salem Witch Trials Memorial in Salem.

Ann's son Thomas testified against George Burroughs at his trial for witchcraft. George Burroughs was executed in August; Thomas testified after Burrough's hanging in a desperate effort to save his mother's life.  

In October 1710, the General Court passed an act reversing the convictions of those for whom their families had pleaded, but Ann Pudeator was not among them. 
Pudeator was exonerated in 1957 by the Massachusetts General Court, partly because of the efforts of Lee Greenslit, a Midwestern textbook publisher who learned about Pudeator's execution while researching his family origins.

Notes

References

1692 deaths
People of the Salem witch trials
American people executed for witchcraft
People executed by the Province of Massachusetts Bay
Executed American women
Colonial American women
American midwives
Year of birth unknown
17th-century executions of American people
People executed by the Thirteen Colonies by hanging
People executed by Massachusetts by hanging
People executed by the Massachusetts Bay Colony
1621 births